Tipton (/ˈtɪptən/) is a city in Cedar County, Iowa, United States. The population was 3,149 at the time of the 2020 census. It is the county seat of Cedar County.

History
Tipton was platted within Center Township in 1840 and was named for General John Tipton, a personal friend of the founder, Henry W. Higgins. The city was incorporated on January 27, 1857.

Geography
Tipton is located at  (41.770530, -91.129061).

Demographics

2000 census
At the 2000 census there were 3,155 people, 1,334 households, and 868 families living in the city. The racial makeup of the city was 98.61% White, 0.35% African American, 0.03% Native American, 0.32% Asian, 0.06% from other races, and 0.63% from two or more races. Hispanic or Latino of any race were 1.08%.

Of the 1,334 households 29.5% had children under the age of 18 living with them, 53.6% were married couples living together, 8.2% had a female householder with no husband present, and 34.9% were non-families. 31.1% of households were one person and 16.6% were one person aged 65 or older. The average household size was 2.31 and the average family size was 2.87.

23.6% are under the age of 18, 7.3% from 18 to 24, 26.6% from 25 to 44, 21.6% from 45 to 64, and 20.9% 65 or older. The median age was 40 years. For every 100 females, there were 93.4 males. For every 100 females age 18 and over, there were 88.6 males.

The median household income was $36,778 and the median family income  was $45,698. Males had a median income of $34,464 versus $21,596 for females. The per capita income for the city was $17,494. About 2.9% of families and 7.0% of the population were below the poverty line, including 6.4% of those under age 18 and 9.4% of those age 65 or over.

2010 census
At the 2010 census there were 3,221 people, 1,394 households, and 842 families living in the city. The racial makup of the city was 97.9% White, 0.3% African American, 0.2% Native American, 0.3% Asian, 0.1% Pacific Islander, 0.2% from other races, and 1.0% from two or more races. Hispanic or Latino of any race were 1.4%.

Of the 1,394 households 29.4% had children under the age of 18 living with them, 48.6% were married couples living together, 8.6% had a female householder with no husband present, 3.2% had a male householder with no wife present, and 39.6% were non-families. 35.4% of households were one person and 17.9% were one person aged 65 or older. The average household size was 2.25 and the average family size was 2.90.

The median age was 42.3 years. 24.2% of residents were under the age of 18; 5.9% were between the ages of 18 and 24; 23.6% were from 25 to 44; 25.5% were from 45 to 64; and 20.8% were 65 or older. The gender makeup of the city was 48.3% male and 51.7% female.

2020 census 

Infrastructure

Transportation
Tipton is served by two highways:  Iowa 38 (which runs north and south through town) and Iowa 130 (which enters Tipton from the east, meets Iowa 38 in the business district, and then runs north in conjunction).

While Tipton is no longer served by any railroads, it was served by two railroads in the past.  The Chicago & Northwestern served Tipton via a spur line from Stanwood to the north.  The tracks were removed in the 1970s.  Tipton was also served by a branch of the Chicago, Rock Island and Pacific Railroad (Rock Island) from Iowa City to Bennett and beyond.  This line ran east and west through the southern part of Tipton and was abandoned in the 1950s.  Evidence of this abandoned right-of-way can still be seen in Tipton in a few places.

Education 

The Tipton Community School District operates local public schools split into 2 separate buildings, one teaching PK-8th and the other teaching 9th-12th. The district is home to roughly 977 students and 144 staff.

Notable people

George Crawford Britton, South Dakota and Washington state politician
Dick Dickinson, actor.
William M. Furnish, paleontologist.
Bertha Lum, who pioneered the use of Japanese art techniques in the U.S.
Gus Monckmeier, racing car driver.
Daria O'Neill, radio and television personality.

See also

Cedar County Sheriff's House and Jail
Iowa Cow War

References

External links

The City of Tipton, Iowa Website Portal style website, Government, Business, Library, Recreation and more
City-Data Comprehensive Statistical Data and more about Tipton

 
Cities in Cedar County, Iowa
Cities in Iowa
County seats in Iowa
1840 establishments in Iowa Territory